The Abou Bakr Al-Siddiq Mosque is a mosque in Bogotá, Colombia.

History
The land where the mosque stands today was purchased in 2010. Soon the construction of the mosque commenced within the same year. It was then completed a year later in 2011 and it was officially opened in the same year.

Architecture
The mosque is the largest mosque in Bogotá.

See also
 Islam in Colombia

References

2011 establishments in Colombia
Buildings and structures in Bogotá
Mosques completed in 2011
Mosques in Colombia